Aria Air was an airline based in Bandar Abbas, Iran. It operated international and domestic passenger service. Officially, its main base was in Bandar Abbas, but the headquarter was located in Tehran.

History 
The airline was established and started operations in 1999 as Aria Air Tour. Aria Air was founded by Captain Mehdi Dadpay, Seyfallah Moradi and Mohammad Hossein Alavi.

Fleet 
The Aria Air fleet consisted of the following aircraft (as of January 2013):

2 Fokker 50

Destinations
Iran
 Kish
 Bandar Abbas
 Mashhad
 Ahvaz
 Bushehr
 Shiraz 
 Lar

United Arab Emirates
 Dubai
 Sharjah

Syria 
 Damascus

Tajikistan 
 Dushanbe

Incidents 
On 13 November 2000, an Aria Air Yakovlev aircraft was hijacked.
On 24 July 2009, Aria Air Flight 1525 an Ilyushin IL-62M, registered UP-I6208,  crashed on landing at Mashhad International Airport, Mashhad, Iran, killing 16 people including the CEO Mehdi Dadpay. 136 of the passengers escaped any harm, but 19 of them were injured.

References

External links

  

Airlines of Iran
Airlines established in 1999
Iranian companies established in 1999